The 1894 Waitemata by-election was a by-election held on 9 April 1894 during the 12th New Zealand Parliament in the rural North Island seat of the Waitemata.

The contest was won by the independent conservative candidate William Massey. Massey somewhat narrowly beat the Liberal candidate Jackson Palmer recording only a 173-vote majority.

Background
The seat was declared vacant when sitting MP Richard Monk had his election declared void. Opposition supporters in the Waitemata area sent a telegram to Massey asking him to stand in the by-election on their behalf. Massey was allegedly atop a haystack when the telegram arrived and it was passed up to him on a pitchfork. He decided to accept. Massey's nomination for the election also came under scrutiny, with a written objection being lodged against him on the alleged ground that one of the men who nominated him was not qualified to do so.

Massey's only opponent was Paeroa lawyer Jackson Palmer, an Independent Liberal, who had won the Waitemata seat previously, in the  election. Fellow conservative Eden George also intended to stand, but ultimately withdrew from the contest.

Results
The following table gives the election results:

Massey stood successfully for Franklin in 1896 and was to stay in Parliament for the remaining 31 years of his life, serving as Prime Minister (1912–25).

Notes

References

Waitemata 1894
1894 elections in New Zealand
Politics of the Auckland Region